Habit is the debut extended play by American indie rock musician Snail Mail, originally released on July 12, 2016 through Sister Polygon Records and later reissued through Matador Records on August 30, 2019. Its only single, "Thinning", was released on January 26, 2017.

Critical reception 

In a review for Pitchfork, Quinn Moreland gave the album a score of 7.7/10. Moreland wrote that the album "wallows in uncertainty and transition – but their songwriting makes it feel both adolescent and eternal... Perhaps that is why Snail Mail sound so alive despite much tangible optimism: there's no person behind a curtain, the ugly resides in reality." The single "Thinning" also caught the attention of NM Mashurov of Pitchfork, who included the song on Pitchforks "best new track" list, describing the song as "lo-fi dream-pop/garage, flat affect carried by fuzzy guitars, indie-pop melodies... 'Thinning' feels lush, like the momentary satisfaction of crawling back into bed when the outside world is too much."

 Track listing 
All tracks are written by Lindsey Jordan, except where noted.

 Personnel 
 Lindsey Jordan – guitar, vocals
 Shawn Durham – drums
 Ryan Vieira – bass
 Jason Sauvage – recording, production
 G.L. Jaguar – recording, production
 TJ Lipple – mastering
 Megan Schaller – artwork
 Taylor Mulitz – design, layout2019 Matador reissue'
 Ray Brown – drums (on "The 2nd Most Beautiful Girl in the World")
 Alex Bass – bass (on "The 2nd Most Beautiful Girl in the World")
 Jake Aron – production, mixing, engineering (on "The 2nd Most Beautiful Girl in the World")
 Dave Cooley – remastering
 Mike Zimmerman – design, layout

References 

Indie rock EPs
Snail Mail (musician) albums
EPs by American artists
2016 debut EPs